Champlin is a commune in the Nièvre department in central France.

Demographics
According to the 1999 census, the population was 48. On 1 January 2019, the estimate was 39.

See also
 Communes of the Nièvre department

References

Communes of Nièvre